Niall Mac Lochlainn (died 1176) was a Cenél nEógain king of the Northern Uí Néill. He was a member of the Meic Lochlainn, and a son of Muirchertach Mac Lochlainn, King of Cenél nEógain. Ruaidrí Ua Conchobair, King of Connacht divided Tír nEógain between Niall and Áed Méith Ua Néill in 1167. Muirchertach's granddaughter, Findguala, who married Guðrøðr Óláfsson, King of Dublin and the Isles, appears to have been a daughter of Niall.

Citations

References

12th-century Irish monarchs
Meic Lochlainn